Mecopus bispinosus is a species of true weevil family.

Description

Distribution 
This species occurs in Papua New Guinea.

References 

 Universal Biological Indexer
 Papua Insects

External links 
 Anic.ento

Baridinae
Beetles described in 1801